Anthony Oliver (4 July 1922, Abersychan, near Pontypool, Monmouthshire, Wales—November 1995, London) was a Welsh film, television  and stage actor.

Selected filmography

 Once a Jolly Swagman (1949) - Derek
 All Over the Town (1949) - P.C. Butt
 A Run for Your Money (1949) - Miner (uncredited)
 Waterfront (1950) - Prison Warder (uncredited)
 The Magnet (1950) - Policeman
 The Clouded Yellow (1950) - Detective (uncredited)
 The Happy Family (1952) - Fireman
 Emergency Call (1952) - Police Constable
 Gift Horse (1952) - Ship's Officer, Guns
 Penny Princess (1952) - Selby's Valet (uncredited)
 Cosh Boy (1953) - Doctor (uncredited)
 Street Corner (1953) - Stanley Foster
 The Runaway Bus (1954) - Duty Officer
 Shetlandsgjengen (1954) - Narrator (voice)
 To Dorothy a Son (1954) - Express Reporter
 Mad About Men (1954) - Pawnbroker
 To Dorothy a Son (1954) - Pawnbroker
 They Can't Hang Me (1955) - Inspector Newcombe
 Lost (1956) - Sgt. Lyel
 Eyewitness (1956) - Podge
 Checkpoint (1956) - Michael
 Sink the Bismarck! (1960) - Operations Officer on HMS Ark Royal (uncredited)
 The Nudist Story (1960) - Stephen Blake
 The Entertainer (1960) - Interviewer
 Crossroads to Crime (1960) - Don Ross
 Transatlantic (1960) - Wentworth
 H.M.S. Defiant (1962) - Tavern Leader
 Out of the Fog (1962) - Chaplain
 Danger by My Side (1962) - Det. Insp. Willoughby

References

External links

1922 births
1995 deaths
20th-century Welsh male actors
Welsh male film actors
Welsh male stage actors
Welsh male television actors
People from Pontypool
Date of death missing